Abhi Subedi is a Nepali poet, playwright, linguist, columnist, translator and critic, who writes in Nepali and English.

Biography 
Abhi Subedi was born in Sabla village of Tehrathum district in eastern Nepal. He was the 21st child of his father and the 7th child of his mother. He recognized Bengali letters before Devnagari scripts after seeing his mother read Bengali epic Kashiram Das's Mahabharata.

Education 
Abhi Subedi was offered a British Council scholarship to the University of Edinburgh in 1978 and completed his post-graduate degree. He wrote about his struggle for education viz a viz the Thatcher government's cut on foreign scholarships and grants and the bureaucratic malice of his university back home.

He earned a Ph.D on the pragmatics of poetry from Tribhuvan University, Kirtipur and did postgraduate work in stylistics and applied linguistics at the University of Edinburgh in Scotland.

Career 
Subedi started as a teacher of English at Tribhuvan University and after returning from Europe taught stylistics there. He taught for 40years at the Central Department of English in Tribhuvan University, and headed the department for more than a decade. Subedi is vice-President of the Nepali Folklore Society of Nepal. He is the founding former President of the International Theatre Institute (ITI) UNESCO from 2000 to 2008 and member of International Playwright's Forum from 2000 to 2011. Subedi became President (1990-1992) and two times General Secretary of the Linguistic Society of Nepal. He was also President of the Literary Association of Nepal. He is a member of the International Association of Theatre Critics. He has been involved in a number of interdisciplinary study groups and is a prolific writer on issues of freedom, culture, literature, arts and social transformation. His essays and seminar papers have been published in Nepal and abroad.

Works 
Subedi has published over two dozen books on different subjects. Several of his plays have been performed by well-known theatre groups in Nepal and abroad. Abhi Subedi's poem, "Soft Storm," is a part of the National Book of Nepal for Class 12 students.

Books in Nepali
Flaneurko Diary (2015/2071)
Sahitya ra Aambritta (Criticism) 2013/2070)
Chiriyeka Sanjhharu (play) 2011
Nibandhama Uttarbarti Kaalkhanda (essays) 2009
Teen Natak (three plays) 2008
Nibandha ra Tundikhel, 2008
Paanch Natak (five plays) 2004
Carpettangieko Aakaas (essays) 1998
Shavda ra Chot (poems), 1997
Madhyam ra Rachana (literary criticism), 1997
Paschatya Kavy Siddhanta, (Western criticism) 1973
Sirjana ra Mulyankan (literary criticism),1982

Books in English
Bruised Evenings 2011 (play)
Nepali Theatre as I See It, 2007
Three Plays. Trans Sangita Rayamajhi, 2003
Dreams of Peach Blossoms, 2001, 2012 (play)
Ekai Kawaguchi: the Trespassing Insider, 1999
Chasing Dreams: Kathmandu Odyssey, (poetic play)
Nepali Literature: Background and History, 1978
Manas (English poems), joint collection with Peter J. Karthak, 1974

Translations, editing and joint collections

Aadhunik Japani Kavita, 1987
Poems of the Century, 2000
Voices from Nepal (joint work), 1999
Beyond Borders: an Anthology of SAARC Poetry, 2002
Japani Haiku: Hijor ra Aaja, 1987
Japani Noh Naatak, 1989
Samakalin Nepali Kavita, 1996
Biswosahityako Aithihashik Rooprekha, 1974
Pacchisbarshakaa Nepali Kavita, 1982

Ecology and Conservation
His keynote speech at the Nepal Year of Conservation 2009 UK Celebration hosted by the Zoological Society of London was published in
the Kathmandu Post on 25 November 2009. In his address he stated that the plentifulness of animals and the perennial existence of opulent nature was a myth and gave examples of visual dramatisation of animals in relation with hegemonic power structures.

Awards 
SAARC Literary Award  2010 - Foundation of SAARC Writers and Literature
Yug Kavi Siddhicharan Award 2013

References

See also 
 List of Nepali translators

1945 births
Living people
20th-century Nepalese poets
Nepali-language poets
English-language poets from Nepal
Nepalese translators
Nepalese dramatists and playwrights
Tribhuvan University alumni
Nepalese scholars
English-language writers
Nepali-language writers
Literary translators
Translators of Suman Pokhrel
People from Tehrathum District
Nepalese male poets
20th-century male writers
Alumni of the University of Edinburgh
English–Nepali translators
Nepali–English translators
Khas people
21st-century Nepalese male writers